Clifford Tamplin (14 May 1920 – 1 February 2006), also known as Cyril Tamplin, was a Welsh cricketer. Tamplin was a right-handed batsman who played primarily as a wicketkeeper.

Tamplin was born in Cardiff, Glamorgan in May 1920. He made his first-class status debut while on war service in India for Bengal against Bihar in the 1942/43 Ranji Trophy at Eden Gardens, Calcutta.

Tamplin later returned to the United Kingdom and made his first-class debut for Glamorgan against the touring South Africans in 1947.  Tamplin played 2 further first-class matches for the county in 1947, against Kent and Derbyshire. In his 4 first-class matches, he scored 56 runs at a batting average of 18.66 and a high score of 40*.  Behind the stumps he took 8 catches and made 2 stumpings.  Tamplin's first-class career may have lasted longer, had it not been for the presence of Haydn Davies in the Glamorgan side.

Tamplin died in Leominster, Herefordshire on 1 February 2006, at the age of 85.

References

External links
Cyril Tamplin at Cricinfo
Clifford Tamplin at CricketArchive

1920 births
2006 deaths
Bengal cricketers
Cricketers from Cardiff
Glamorgan cricketers
Welsh cricketers
Wicket-keepers